Atelopus lynchi is a species of toad in the family Bufonidae.
It is endemic to Ecuador.
Its natural habitats are subtropical or tropical moist lowland forests, subtropical or tropical moist montane forests, and rivers.
It is threatened by habitat loss.

References

Sources
 

lynchi
Amphibians of Ecuador
Endemic fauna of Ecuador
Amphibians described in 1981
Taxonomy articles created by Polbot